Richard H. Butler  (December 1869 – July 16, 1917) was an American Major League Baseball catcher. He played for the 1897 Louisville Colonels and 1899 Washington Senators.

Sources

Major League Baseball catchers
Louisville Colonels players
Washington Senators (1891–1899) players
Baseball players from New York (state)
1869 births
1917 deaths
19th-century baseball players
Augusta Kennebecs players
Rochester Brownies players
Montreal Royals players
Toronto Maple Leafs (International League) players
Burials at Holy Cross Cemetery, Brooklyn